The Canadian Political Science Association is an organization of political scientists in Canada.  It is a bilingual organization and publishes the bilingual journal Canadian Journal of Political Science.  The organization is headquartered in Ottawa, Ontario, and has an annual convention in conjunction with the Canadian Federation for the Humanities and Social Sciences.

Presidents
Adam Shortt (Civil Service Commission), 1913–1914
Oscar D. Skelton (Queen's), 1929–1930
Stephen Leacock (McGill), 1934–1935
R. H. Coats (Toronto), 1935–1936
W. A. Mackintosh (Queen's), 1936–1937
H. A. Innis (Toronto), 1937–1938
J. W. Dafoe (Winnipeg Free Press), 1938–1939
J. C. Hemmeon, 1939–1940
W. C. Clark (Deputy Minister of Finance), 1940–1941
H. Mitchell, 1941–1942
C. A. Dawson, 1942–1943
R. A. MacKay (Dalhousie), 1943–1944
K. W. Taylor, 1944–1945
R. MacGregor Dawson (Toronto), 1945–1946
F. A. Knox, 1946–1947
V.W. Bladen (Toronto), 1947–1948
H. F. Angus (British Columbia), 1948–1949
W. B. Hurd (McMaster), 1949–1950
C. A. Curtis (Curtis), 1950–1951
G.-H. Levesque (Laval), 1951–1952
Herbert Marshall, 1952–1953
Alexander Brady (Toronto), 1953–1954
J. A. Corry (Queen's), 1954–1955
J. D. Gibson, 1955–1956
G. E. Britnell (Saskatchewan), 1956–1957
G. A. Elliott (Alberta), 1957–1958
S. D. Clark (Toronto), 1958–1959
Mabel F. Timlin (Saskatchewan), 1959–1960
C. A. Ashley, 1960–1961
Eugene Forsey (Canadian Labour Congress), 1961–1962
W.J. Waines, 1962–1963
C. B. Macpherson (Toronto), 1963–1964
Jean-Charles Falardeau (Laval), 1964–1965
Harry G. Johnson (London School of Economics/Chicago), 1965–1966
Anthony D. Scott (British Columbia), 1966–1967
H. B. Mayo (Carleton), 1967–1968
Donald V. Smiley (British Columbia), 1968–1969
Douglas V. Verney (York), 1969–1970
Gilles Lalande (Montréal), 1970–1971
J. E. Hodgetts (Toronto), 1971–1972
Jean Laponce (British Columbia), 1972–1973
John Meisel (Queen's), 1973–1974
Léon Dion (Laval), 1974–1975
Donald C. Rowat (Carleton), 1975–1976
Alan Cairns (British Columbia), 1976–1977
Hugh Thorburn (Queen's), 1977–1978
Kenneth D. McRae (Carleton), 1978–1979
Paul W. Fox (Toronto), 1979–1980
Walter D. Young (Victoria), 1980–1981
Denis W. Stairs (Dalhousie), 1981–1982
Edwin R. Black (Queen's), 1982–1983
Caroline Andrew (Ottawa), 1983–1984
Kalevi J. Holsti (British Columbia), 1984–1985
Frederick C. Engelmann, (Alberta), 1985–1986
O.P. Dwivedi (Guelph), 1986–1987
John C. Courtney (Saskatchewan), 1987–1988
David J. Elkins (British Columbia), 1988–1989
André-J. Bélanger (Montréal), 1989–1990
Peter H. Russell (Toronto), 1990–1991
Vincent Lemieux (Laval), 1991–1992
V. Seymour Wilson (Carleton), 1992–1993
Sylvia Bashevkin (Toronto), 1993–1994
David Smith (Saskatchewan), 1994–1995
Peter Aucoin (Dalhousie), 1995–1996
Jane Jenson (Montréal), 1996–1997
Tom Pocklington (Alberta), 1997–1998
Donald J. Savoie (Moncton), 1998–1999
Roger Gibbins (Calgary), 1999–2000
Kenneth McRoberts (York), 2000–2001
R. Kenneth Carty (British Columbia), 2001–2002
Grace Skogstad (Toronto), 2002–2003
Robert Young (Western Ontario), 2003–2004
André Blais (Montréal), 2004–2005
Kim Richard Nossal (Queen's), 2005–2006
Elisabeth Gidengil (McGill), 2006–2007
Richard Johnston (Pennsylvania), 2007–2008
Miriam Smith (York), 2008–2009
Keith Banting (Queen's), 2009–2010
Graham White (University of Toronto), 2010–2011
Reeta Tremblay (Victoria), 2011–2012
Michael Atkinson (Saskatchewan), 2012–2013
Alain Noël (Montréal), 2013–2014
Jill Vickers (Carleton), 2014–2015
William Cross (Carleton), 2015–2016
Yasmeen Abu-Laban (Alberta), 2016–2017
Janet Hiebert (Queen's), 2017–2018
François Rocher (Ottawa), 2018–2019
Barbara Arneil (British Columbia), 2019–2020
Joanna Everitt (University of New Brunswick – Saint John), 2020–2021
Cheryl Collier (University of Windsor), 2021–2022

Further reading
W.J.A. Donald, "The Canadian Political Science Association," Journal of Political Economy, vol. 21, no. 8 (Oct. 1913), pp. 762–764. .
Janice Newton, "The Formative Decades of the CPSA," Canadian Journal of Political Science, vol. 50, no. 1 (March 2017), pp. 37–55.

External links

Learned societies of Canada
Political science organizations
Political science in Canada
Organizations based in Ottawa
Organizations with year of establishment missing